Gloiothele is a genus of fungi in the Peniophoraceae family. The genus was circumscribed by mycologist Giacomo Bresadola in 1920.

References

Russulales
Russulales genera